This is a list of the 45 municipalities in the province and autonomous community of Murcia, Spain, with their land areas and their populations at the Censuses of 2001, 2011 and 2021.

See also

Geography of Spain
List of cities in Spain

References

Murcia